The following lists events that happened during 2002 in Laos.

Incumbents
President: Khamtai Siphandon
Vice President: Choummaly Sayasone
Prime Minister: Bounnhang Vorachith

Events
date unknown - 2002 Lao League

February
24 February - 2002 Laotian parliamentary election

References

 
Years of the 21st century in Laos
Laos
2000s in Laos
Laos